The advanced debugger adb is the standard UNIX debugger found on Solaris 1 and 2, HP-UX, SCO and Venix. It is the successor of a debugger called db.

Overview
The initial version was written by Stephen R. Bourne. ADB is the standard debugger on Solaris and the Solaris kernel debugger kadb that was introduced with SunOS-3.5 (1986) is a minor variant of adb.

A version of ADB was integrated into the BSD kernel as a kernel debugger.

On Solaris, ADB was replaced by the Modular Debugger mdb with Solaris 8 (2000) and the ADB command-line interface now is emulated by mdb when it is called as adb. Mdb has become OpenSource with OpenSolaris.

See also
DBX, the symbolic debugger

References

External links
A Tutorial Introduction to ADB. J. F. Maranzano, S. R. Bourne / Bell Laboratories 

Debuggers